The 2016 İstanbul Cup (also known as the TEB BNP Paribas İstanbul Cup for sponsorship reasons) was a tennis tournament played on outdoor clay courts. It was the 9th edition of the İstanbul Cup, and part of the WTA International tournaments of the 2016 WTA Tour. It took place in Istanbul, Turkey, from 18 April through 24 April 2016.

Points and prize money

Prize money

Singles main-draw entrants

Seeds

 Rankings are as of April 11, 2016.

Other entrants
The following players received wildcards into the singles main draw:
  Ayla Aksu 
  İpek Soylu
  Dayana Yastremska

The following players received entry from the qualifying draw:
  Sorana Cîrstea
  Réka-Luca Jani
  Kristína Kučová
  Marina Melnikova
  Maria Sakkari
  Maryna Zanevska

Withdrawals 
Before the tournament
Due to security concerns, the WTA allowed players to withdraw and enter other WTA/ITF tournaments without penalty.
  Victoria Azarenka → replaced by  Alexandra Dulgheru
  Petra Cetkovská → replaced by  Çağla Büyükakçay
  Irina Falconi → replaced by  Stefanie Vögele
  Camila Giorgi (entered Stuttgart qualifying) → replaced by  Tsvetana Pironkova
  Lucie Hradecká → replaced by  Donna Vekić
  Yulia Putintseva → replaced by  Kateryna Kozlova
  Laura Robson (entered Stuttgart qualifying) → replaced by  Kurumi Nara
  Yaroslava Shvedova → replaced by  Anastasija Sevastova
  Alison Van Uytvanck → replaced by  Olga Govortsova
  Heather Watson → replaced by  Aliaksandra Sasnovich
  Caroline Wozniacki (ankle injury) → replaced by  Andreea Mitu

Doubles main-draw entrants

Seeds 

 1 Rankings as of April 11, 2016.

Other entrants 
The following pairs received wildcards into the doubles main draw:
  Ayla Aksu /  Melis Sezer
  Çağla Büyükakçay /  Anna Karolína Schmiedlová

Withdrawals 
During the tournament
  Nao Hibino (right shoulder injury)
  Danka Kovinić (right hamstring strain)

Retirements 
  Maryna Zanevska (left shoulder injury)

Champions

Singles

  Çağla Büyükakçay def.  Danka Kovinić, 3–6, 6–2, 6–3.

Doubles

 Andreea Mitu /  İpek Soylu def.  Xenia Knoll /  Danka Kovinić, walkover

References

External links
 Official website 
 Players list 

2016 in Istanbul
Istanbul Cup
Istanbul Cup
İstanbul Cup
İstanbul Cup